Jay Patrick Harbaugh (born June 14, 1989) is an American football coach who currently serves as special teams coordinator and safeties coach at the University of Michigan. He is the son of Michigan head coach Jim Harbaugh, grandson of former player and coach Jack Harbaugh, and the nephew of Baltimore Ravens head coach, John Harbaugh.

Early life and family
A native of San Diego, California, Harbaugh attended St. Augustine High School. He played defensive line in high school, but knee injuries ended his career. Harbaugh earned a bachelor's degree in sociology from Oregon State University, and completed an internship with the San Francisco 49ers prior to his senior year.

Coaching career

Oregon State
Harbaugh spent four seasons as an undergraduate assistant at Oregon State under head coach Mike Riley. Riley was the head coach of the San Diego Chargers in 1999 and 2000 when his father was playing quarterback.

Baltimore Ravens
Harbaugh spent three seasons in all working in Baltimore for the Ravens under his uncle John Harbaugh. In 2014, his work focused on statistical analysis, self-scouting reports and breakdowns of opposing defenses. He was on the Ravens' staff the year they beat his father's San Francisco 49ers in Super Bowl XLVII.

Michigan
On January 20, 2015, Harbaugh was officially introduced as part of the Michigan football staff and served as the tight ends coach and as an assistant special teams coach for the Wolverines. For the 2017 season, he was named running backs and special teams coach. He moved back to tight ends and special teams coach for the 2021 season. Prior to the 2022 season, Michigan announced that Harbaugh would coach safeties in addition to coordinating special teams, with Ronald Bellamy moving from safeties to wide receivers, and Grant Newsome taking over duties as tight ends coach.

Following the 2021 season, Harbaugh was named the FootballScoop.com Special Teams Coordinator of the Year.

Personal life
Harbaugh is married to his wife Brhitney, with whom he has two children.

References

External links
 Michigan Wolverines bio

1989 births
Living people
American football defensive linemen
Baltimore Ravens coaches
Coaches of American football from California
Harbaugh family
Michigan Wolverines football coaches
Oregon State Beavers football coaches
Oregon State University alumni
Players of American football from San Diego